The Hoveyzeh (Persian: موشک کروز هویزه) is an Iranian designed and built, all-weather, surface-to-surface cruise missile. The Hoveyzeh is from the Soumar family of cruise missiles. The missile was unveiled at a defense exhibition in Tehran on 2 February 2019 during celebrations of the 40th anniversary of the 1979 Iranian Revolution. The Aerospace force of the Islamic Revolutionary Guard Corps will acquire and be supplied with these missiles.

The surface-to-surface cruise missile is capable of low altitude flight and has a range of 1,350 km, with the ability to strike ground targets with high precision and accuracy.

Name 

The Hoveyzeh surface-to-surface cruise missile is named in honor of the Iranian town of Hoveyzeh in the Khuzestan Province. The city sustained heavy casualties and ubiquitous damage during the war and was a victim of chemical weapons used by Iraqi forces during the Iran–Iraq War.

Development 

The Hoveyzeh is a part of the Soumar cruise missile family, which was unveiled in 2015 with the first missile of the family being the Soumar which had a range of 700 km. Although this claim is disputed by some media outlets claiming that due to the missile's similarities with the Kh-55, acquired from Ukraine in 2001, that the Soumar missile has a range of 2,000–3,000 km. It is believed that the Hoveizeh is either an upgrade to or has been developed from the Soumar.

It was unveiled and displayed to the public on 2 February 2019 at a Tehran defense exhibition celebrating the 40th anniversary of the 1979 Iranian Revolution. The missile was put into service and will be supplied to the Aerospace force of the Islamic Revolutionary Guard Corps.

During Iranian Defense Minister Brigadier General Amir Hatami's interview with the press about the missile, he stated that the missile has been designed and manufactured by Iran Aviation Industries Organization (IAIO) with the missile being tested on the day of the unveiling, complemented with video evidence, successfully travelling 1,200 km and striking test targets with precision accuracy.

Capabilities 

The missile is capable of low altitude flight with a range of 1350 km.

Israeli military intelligence website DEBKAfile states that: "Iran has succeeded in producing low-flying cruise missiles that fly to target under the radar."

Airborne early warning radar systems can detect low flying cruise missiles with varying effectiveness. Additionally, any system capable of detecting the launching or take off of aircraft (e.g., surveillance satellites) can be used to identify that a cruise missile has been launched, which can give a responding military force time to get effective airborne surveillance aloft. This is usually done during active military engagements due to cost and the limited numbers of planes.

Operators 
  – number of units is unknown

See also 
 Defense industry of Iran
 List of military equipment manufactured in Iran
 Iranian underground missile bases
 Armed Forces of the Islamic Republic of Iran
 Islamic Republic of Iran Army
 Iran Electronics Industries
 Science and technology in Iran
 Hoveyzeh (armored car)

References

External links 
Videos
 Iran unveils new missile on 40th anniversary of revolution – Euronews (English)
 - YouTube – Ruptly (Persian, not translated to English)
 Iran Test fires 1350 Km range Turbofan jet Hoveizeh Land attack cruise missile موشك كروز هويزه – IRIB (Iranian-state TV, Persian)

Cruise missiles of Iran
Islamic Republic of Iran Army
Surface-to-surface missiles of Iran
Guided missiles of Iran
Military equipment introduced in the 2010s